The regalia of the pharaoh are the symbolic objects of the royalty of Ancient Egypt, including crowns, headdresses, and scepters.

Bibliographic sources 

 Marie-Ange Bonhême and Annie Forgeau, Pharaon : Les secrets du Pouvoir, Paris, Armand Colin, 1988, 349 p.
 Yvonne Bonnamy and Ashraf Sadek, Dictionnaire des hiéroglyphes : hiéroglyphes-français, Arles, Actes Sud, 2010, 986 p.
 Jean-Pierre Corteggiani (ill. Laïla Ménassa), L'Égypte ancienne et ses dieux, dictionnaire illustré, Paris, éditions Fayard, 2007, 588 p.
 Christiane Desroches Noblecourt, Toutânkhamon, vie et mort d'un pharaon, Paris, Pygmalion, 1963 (reprint 1988), 248 p.
 Isabelle Franco, Nouveau dictionnaire de mythologie égyptienne, Paris, Pygmalion, 1999, 319 p.
 Nicolas-Christophe Grimal, Les termes de la propagande royale égyptienne de la XIXe dynastie à la conquête d'Alexandre, Paris, Imprimerie Nationale / Diffusion de Boccard, 1986, 764 p.
 Philippe Huet and Marie Huet, L'animal dans l'Égypte ancienne, Saint-Claude-de-Diray, Éditions Hesse, 2013, 157 p.
 Jean Leclant (directeur), Dictionnaire de l'Antiquité, Paris, PUF, 2005 (reprint 2011), 2389 p.
 Bernadette Menu (pref. Charles de Lespinay and Raymond Verdier), Égypte pharaonique : Nouvelles recherches sur l'histoire juridique, économique et sociale de l'ancienne Égypte, Paris, L'Harmattan, 2004, 391 p..
 Claude Obsomer, Ramsès II, Paris, Pygmalion, 2012, 558 p.
 Jean Vercoutter, À la recherche de l’Égypte oubliée, Paris, Gallimard, coll. « Découvertes Gallimard / Archéologie » (no 1), 2007, 160 p.
 Pascal Vernus and Jean Yoyotte, Dictionnaire des pharaons, Paris, Éditions Noêsis, 1988 (reprint 1998), 226 p.
 Toby A.H. Wilkinson, Early Dynastic Egypt, London, Routledge, 1999, 413 p..

Ancient Egypt
Ancient Egyptian symbols